Desmia is a genus of moths of the family Crambidae. The genus was erected by John O. Westwood in 1832.

Species
Desmia albisectalis (Dognin, 1905)
Desmia albitarsalis Hampson, 1917
Desmia angustalis Schaus, 1920
Desmia anitalis Schaus, 1920
Desmia bajulalis (Guenée, 1854)
Desmia benealis Schaus, 1920
Desmia bifidalis Hampson, 1912
Desmia bigeminalis (Dognin, 1905)
Desmia bourguignoni Ghesquière, 1942
Desmia ceresalis Walker, 1859
Desmia chryseis Hampson, 1898
Desmia ciliata (Swinhoe, 1894)
Desmia clarkei Amsel, 1956
Desmia clytialis Walker, 1859
Desmia cristinae Schaus, 1912
Desmia ctenuchalis (Dognin, 1907)
Desmia daedala (Druce, 1895)
Desmia decemmaculalis Amsel, 1956
Desmia dentipuncta Hampson, 1912
Desmia deploralis Hampson, 1912
Desmia desmialis (Barnes & McDunnough, 1914)
Desmia discrepans (Butler, 1887)
Desmia extrema (Walker, 1856)
Desmia falcatalis E. Hering, 1906
Desmia filicornis Munroe, 1959
Desmia flavalis Schaus, 1912
Desmia flebilialis (Guenée, 1854)
Desmia funebralis Guenée, 1854
Desmia funeralis (Hübner, 1796)
Desmia geminalis Snellen, 1875
Desmia geminipuncta Hampson, 1912
Desmia girtealis Schaus, 1920
Desmia grandisalis Schaus, 1912
Desmia hadriana (Druce, 1895)
Desmia herrichialis E. Hering, 1906
Desmia hoffmannsi E. Hering, 1906
Desmia ilsalis Schaus, 1920
Desmia incomposita (Bethune-Baker, 1909)
Desmia intermicalis (Guenée, 1854)
Desmia jonesalis Schaus, 1920
Desmia julialis Schaus, 1920
Desmia lacrimalis Hampson, 1912
Desmia leucothyris (Dognin, 1909)
Desmia lycopusalis Walker, 1859
Desmia melaleucalis Hampson, 1899
Desmia melanalis (C. Felder, R. Felder & Rogenhofer, 1875)
Desmia melanopalis Hampson, 1912
Desmia mesosticta Hampson, 1912
Desmia microstictalis Hampson, 1904
Desmia minnalis Schaus, 1920
Desmia mortualis Hampson, 1912
Desmia naclialis Snellen, 1875
Desmia natalialis Schaus, 1920
Desmia niveiciliata E. Hering, 1906
Desmia octomaculalis Amsel, 1956
Desmia odontoplaga Hampson, 1898
Desmia pantalis Dyar, 1927
Desmia parastigma Dyar, 1927
Desmia paucimaculalis Hampson, 1898
Desmia pentodontalis Hampson, 1898
Desmia perfecta Butler, 1882
Desmia peruviana E. Hering, 1906
Desmia phaiorrhoea Dyar, 1914
Desmia pisusalis Walker, 1859
Desmia ploralis (Guenée, 1854)
Desmia quadrimaculata E. Hering, 1906
Desmia quadrinotalis Herrich-Schäffer, 1871
Desmia recurvalis Schaus, 1940
Desmia revindicata E. Hering, 1906
Desmia ruptilinealis Hampson, 1912
Desmia semirufalis (Hampson, 1918)
Desmia semivacualis Dognin, 1903
Desmia sepulchralis Guenée, 1854
Desmia stenizonalis Hampson, 1912
Desmia stenoleuca Hampson, 1912
Desmia strigivitralis (Guenée, 1854)
Desmia subdivisalis Grote, 1871
Desmia tages (Cramer, 1777)
Desmia tellesalis Walker, 1859
Desmia tenuimaculata Hering, 1906
Desmia tenuizona Hampson, 1912
Desmia tetratocera Dyar, 1914
Desmia trimaculalis E. Hering, 1906
Desmia ufeus (Cramer, 1777)
Desmia unipunctalis (Druce, 1895)
Desmia validalis Dognin, 1903
Desmia vicina Dognin, 1906
Desmia vulcanalis (C. Felder, R. Felder & Rogenhofer, 1875)
Desmia zebinalis Walker, 1859

Former species
Desmia horaria Meyrick, 1937, now Desmia incomposita (Bethune-Baker, 1909)

Status unknown
Desmia sextalis

References

 
Spilomelinae
Crambidae genera
Taxa named by John O. Westwood